was the twenty-second of the sixty-nine stations of the Nakasendō. It is located in the present-day city of Saku, in Nagano Prefecture, Japan.

History
Originally, Iwamurada-shuku was a castle town for the Iwamurada Han and, as a post town, it never developed a proper honjin, though it did have some smaller inns.

Neighboring Post Towns
Nakasendō
Otai-shuku - Iwamurada-shuku - Shionada-shuku

References

Stations of the Nakasendō
Stations of the Nakasendo in Nagano Prefecture